Euacidalia is a genus of moths in the family Geometridae described by Packard in 1873.

Species
 Euacidalia angusta (Warren, 1906)
 Euacidalia brownsvillea Cassino, 1931
 Euacidalia certissa (Druce, 1893)
 Euacidalia externata (Walker, 1863)
 Euacidalia nigridaria Cassino, 1931
 Euacidalia nitipennis Dyar, 1916
 Euacidalia orbelia (Druce, 1893)
 Euacidalia oroandes (Druce, 1893)
 Euacidalia puerta Cassino, 1931
 Euacidalia quakerata Cassino, 1931
 Euacidalia rosea (Warren, 1897)
 Euacidalia sericearia Packard, 1873

References

Sterrhini